Dubna is a town in Moscow Oblast, Russia.

Dubna may also refer to:

Inhabited localities
Dubna, Latvia, a village in Dubna parish, Daugavpils municipality, Latvia
Dubna, Russia, name of several inhabited localities in Russia
Dubna, Soroca, a commune in Soroca District, Moldova

Rivers
Dubna (Volga), a river in central Russia, a tributary of the Volga
Dubna (Upa), a river in Tula Oblast, Russia, a tributary of the Upa
Dubna (Daugava), a river in Latvia, a tributary of the Daugava

Other uses
Dubna, informal name of Joint Institute for Nuclear Research, a large international research institute situated in the town of Dubna, Russia
Dubna 48K, a clone of ZX spectrum computer

See also
Dubno